Torquemada is an 1882 play by Victor Hugo about Tomás de Torquemada and the Inquisition in Spain. It criticized religious fanaticism and fanatical catholicism. It was first published in 1882, as a protest against antisemitic pogroms in Russia at the time.

References 

Plays by Victor Hugo
1882 plays
Biographical plays about religious leaders
Plays about religion and science
Plays set in the 15th century
Plays set in Spain
Plays based on real people
Cultural depictions of Tomás de Torquemada
Inquisition in fiction